Abasgadzhi Mukhtarovich Magomedov (born 15 March 1998) is a Russian freestyle wrestler of Tindi heritage who competes at 61 kilograms. He is the reigning World Champion, defeating Daton Fix to claim the gold medal. An accomplished athlete, Magomedov is also the 2020 Individual World Cup winner, the reigning European Continental champion, the reigning Russian National champion, the reigning Golden Grand Prix Ivan Yarygin champion (three–time medalist), was the 2019 U23 European Champion and a Junior World and European champion.

Major results

Freestyle record 

! colspan="7"| Senior Freestyle Matches
|-
!  Res.
!  Record
!  Opponent
!  Score
!  Date
!  Event
!  Location
|-
! style=background:white colspan=7 | 
|-
|Win
|82–7
|align=left| Akhmed Idrisov
|style="font-size:88%"|4–2
|style="font-size:88%" rowspan=5|June 24–26, 2022
|style="font-size:88%" rowspan=5|2022 Russian National Championships
|style="text-align:left;font-size:88%;" rowspan=5|
 Kyzyl, Russia
|-
|Win
|81–7
|align=left| Bashir Magomedov
|style="font-size:88%"|4–0
|-
|Win
|80–7
|align=left| Muslim Mekhtikhanov
|style="font-size:88%"|
|-
|Win
|79–7
|align=left| Kezhik Mongush
|style="font-size:88%"|TF 15–4
|-
|Win
|78–7
|align=left| Zhargal Damdinov
|style="font-size:88%"|13–8
|-
! style=background:white colspan=7 |
|-
|Win
|77–7
|align=left| Bashir Magomedov
|style="font-size:88%"|8–3
|style="font-size:88%" rowspan=3|May 19–20, 2022
|style="font-size:88%" rowspan=3|2022 Ivan Poddubny Wrestling League
|style="text-align:left;font-size:88%;" rowspan=3|
 Moscow, Russia
|-
|Win
|76–7
|align=left| Magomed Baytukayev
|style="font-size:88%"|TF 10–0
|-
|Win
|75–7
|align=left| Ramazan Bagavudinov
|style="font-size:88%"|TF 11–0
|-
! style=background:white colspan=7 |
|-
|Win
|74–7
|align=left| Fedor Baltuev
|style="font-size:88%"|9–8
|style="font-size:88%" rowspan=5|27–30 January 2022
|style="font-size:88%" rowspan=5|Golden Grand Prix Ivan Yarygin 2022
|style="text-align:left;font-size:88%;" rowspan=5|
 Krasnoyarsk, Russia
|-
|Win
|73–7
|align=left| Muslim Mekhtikhanov
|style="font-size:88%"|6–3
|-
|Win
|72–7
|align=left| Zelimkhan Abakarov
|style="font-size:88%"|6–0
|-
|Win
|71–7
|align=left| Semen Vladimirov
|style="font-size:88%"|TF 12–1
|-
|Win
|70–7
|align=left| Azat Ogannissyan
|style="font-size:88%"|TF 11–0
|-
! style=background:white colspan=7 |
|-
|Win
|69–7
|align=left| Daton Fix
|style="font-size:88%"|4–1
|style="font-size:88%"|3 October 2021
|style="font-size:88%" rowspan=4|2021 World Championships
|style="text-align:left;font-size:88%;" rowspan=4| Oslo, Norway
|-
|Win
|68–7
|align=left| Toshihiro Hasegawa
|style="font-size:88%"|TF 10–0
|style="font-size:88%" rowspan=3|2 October 2021
|-
|Win
|67–7
|align=left| Tümenbilegiin Tüvshintulga
|style="font-size:88%"|Fall
|-
|Win
|66–7
|align=left| Emrah Ormanoğlu
|style="font-size:88%"|Fall
|-
! style=background:white colspan=7 |
|-
|Win
|65–7
|align=left| Rustam Karakhanov
|style="font-size:88%"|Fall
|style="font-size:88%" rowspan=5|27–28 May 2021
|style="font-size:88%" rowspan=5|Golden Grand Prix Ivan Yarygin 2021
|style="text-align:left;font-size:88%;" rowspan=5|
 Krasnoyarsk, Russia
|-
|Win
|64–7
|align=left| Kezhik Mongush
|style="font-size:88%"|TF 10–0
|-
|Win
|63–7
|align=left| Zhargal Damdinov
|style="font-size:88%"|Fall
|-
|Win
|62–7
|align=left| Nodar Arabidze
|style="font-size:88%"|TF 14–2
|-
|Win
|61–7
|align=left| Petr Pavlov
|style="font-size:88%"|TF 11–0
|-
! style=background:white colspan=7 | 
|-
|Win
|60–7
|align=left| Andrii Dzhelep
|style="font-size:88%"|TF 12–2
|style="font-size:88%" rowspan=4|19–20 April 2021
|style="font-size:88%" rowspan=4|2021 European Continental Championships
|style="text-align:left;font-size:88%;" rowspan=4|
 Warsaw, Poland
|-
|Win
|59–7
|align=left| Eduard Grigorev
|style="font-size:88%"|4–2
|-
|Win
|58–7
|align=left| Emrah Ormanoğlu 
|style="font-size:88%"|Fall
|-
|Win
|57–7
|align=left| Georgi Vangelov
|style="font-size:88%"|Fall
|-
! style=background:white colspan=7 | 
|-
|Win
|56–7
|align=left| Muslim Mekhtikhanov
|style="font-size:88%"|4–1
|style="font-size:88%" rowspan=5|11–14 March 2021
|style="font-size:88%" rowspan=5|2021 Russian National Freestyle Wrestling Championships
|style="text-align:left;font-size:88%;" rowspan=5|
 Ulan-Ude, Russia
|-
|Win
|55–7
|align=left| Aldar Balzhinimayev
|style="font-size:88%"|TF 10–0
|-
|Win
|54–7
|align=left| Aleksander Sabanov
|style="font-size:88%"|8–4
|-
|Win
|53–7
|align=left| Rustam Karachanov
|style="font-size:88%"|TF 12–2
|-
|Win
|52–7
|align=left| Islam Malchagov
|style="font-size:88%"|TF 12–0
|-
! style=background:white colspan=7 |
|-
|Win
|51–7
|align=left| Akhmednabi Gvarzatilov
|style="font-size:88%"|5–1
|style="font-size:88%" rowspan=4|16–18 December 2020
|style="font-size:88%" rowspan=4|2020 Individual World Cup
|style="text-align:left;font-size:88%;" rowspan=4|
 Belgrade, Serbia
|-
|Win
|50–7
|align=left| Agustín Destribats
|style="font-size:88%"|7–0
|-
|Win
|49–7
|align=left| Razmik Papikyan
|style="font-size:88%"|TF 10–0
|-
|Win
|48–7
|align=left| Volodymyr Burukov
|style="font-size:88%"|TF 12–2
|-
! style=background:white colspan=7 |
|-
|Win
|47–7
|align=left| Ramazan Ferzaliev
|style="font-size:88%"|8–7
|style="font-size:88%" rowspan=4|16–18 October 2020
|style="font-size:88%" rowspan=4|2020 Russian National Freestyle Wrestling Championships
|style="text-align:left;font-size:88%;" rowspan=4|
 Naro-Fominsk, Russia
|-
|Win
|46–7
|align=left| Ibragim Abdurakhmanov
|style="font-size:88%"|4–2
|-
|Win
|45–7
|align=left| Tamerlan Karaev
|style="font-size:88%"|TF 10–0
|-
|Win
|44–7
|align=left| Dmitri Aksenov
|style="font-size:88%"|Fall
|-
! style=background:white colspan=7 |
|-
|Win
|43–7
|align=left| Vladimir Kudrin
|style="font-size:88%"|TF 10–0
|style="font-size:88%" rowspan=4|23–26 January 2020
|style="font-size:88%" rowspan=4|Golden Grand Prix Ivan Yarygin 2020
|style="text-align:left;font-size:88%;" rowspan=4|
 Krasnoyarsk, Russia
|-
|Loss
|42–7
|align=left| Aleksandr Bogomoev
|style="font-size:88%"|0–3
|-
|Win
|42–6
|align=left| Nurtilek Ermekbaev
|style="font-size:88%"|TF 16–6
|-
|Win
|41–6
|align=left| Bold Tumentsogt
|style="font-size:88%"|TF 10–0
|-
! style=background:white colspan=7 | 
|-
|Win
|40–6
|align=left| Yowlys Bonne
|style="font-size:88%"|12–2
|style="font-size:88%"|6 January 2020
|style="font-size:88%"|2019–2020 Deutsche Ringerliga
|style="text-align:left;font-size:88%;"|
 Germany
|-
! style=background:white colspan=7 | 
|-
|Loss
|39–6
|align=left| Ramazan Ferzaliev
|style="font-size:88%"|7–10
|style="font-size:88%" rowspan=4|7–8 December 2019
|style="font-size:88%" rowspan=4|2019 Alans International
|style="text-align:left;font-size:88%;" rowspan=4|
 Vladikavkaz, Russia
|-
|Win
|39–5
|align=left| Zelimkhan Abakarov
|style="font-size:88%"|8–7
|-
|Win
|38–5
|align=left| Abbos Rakhmonov
|style="font-size:88%"|15–6
|-
|Win
|37–5
|align=left| Magomed Salavatov
|style="font-size:88%"|TF 10–0
|-
|Win
|36–5
|align=left| Dzimchyk Rynchnau
|style="font-size:88%"|TF 18–2
|style="font-size:88%"|23 November 2019
|style="font-size:88%" rowspan=4|2019–2020 Deutsche Ringerliga
|style="text-align:left;font-size:88%;" rowspan=4|
 Germany
|-
|Win
|35–5
|align=left| Yowlys Bonne
|style="font-size:88%"|6–2
|style="font-size:88%"|16 November 2019
|-
|Win
|34–5
|align=left| Akhmednabi Gvarzatilov
|style="font-size:88%"|9–4
|style="font-size:88%"|5 October 2019
|-
|Loss
|33–5
|align=left| Zelmikan Abakarov
|style="font-size:88%"|5–5
|style="font-size:88%"|28 September 2019
|-
! style=background:white colspan=7 | 
|-
|Win
|33–4
|align=left| Arsen Harutyunyan
|style="font-size:88%"|TF 12–2
|style="font-size:88%" rowspan=3|23–24 July 2019
|style="font-size:88%" rowspan=3|2019 Stepan Sargsyan Cup
|style="text-align:left;font-size:88%;" rowspan=3|
 Vanadzor, Armenia
|-
|Win
|32–4
|align=left| Zagir Shakhiev
|style="font-size:88%"|TF 10–0
|-
|Win
|31–4
|align=left| Amirkhan Guvazhokov
|style="font-size:88%"|TF 10–0
|-
! style=background:white colspan=7 | 
|-
|Win
|30–4
|align=left| Georgios Pilidis
|style="font-size:88%"|4–0
|style="font-size:88%" rowspan=3|4–10 March 2019
|style="font-size:88%" rowspan=3|2019 U23 European Continental Championships
|style="text-align:left;font-size:88%;" rowspan=3|
 Novi Sad, Serbia
|-
|Win
|29–4
|align=left| Asgar Mammadaliyev
|style="font-size:88%"|TF 10–0
|-
|Win
|28–4
|align=left| Uladzislau Koika
|style="font-size:88%"|TF 12–0
|-
! style=background:white colspan=7 |
|-
|Loss
|27–4
|align=left| Muslim Sadulaev
|style="font-size:88%"|4–4
|style="font-size:88%" rowspan=4|24 January 2019
|style="font-size:88%" rowspan=4|Golden Grand Prix Ivan Yarygin 2019
|style="text-align:left;font-size:88%;" rowspan=4|
 Krasnoyarsk, Russia
|-
|Win
|27–3
|align=left| Bekhbayar Erdenebat
|style="font-size:88%"|5–5
|-
|Win
|26–3
|align=left| Thomas Gilman
|style="font-size:88%"|Fall
|-
|Win
|25–3
|align=left| Ahmet Peker
|style="font-size:88%"|TF 13–3
|-
! style=background:white colspan=7 | 
|-
|Win
|24–3
|align=left| Donduk-ool Khuresh-ool
|style="font-size:88%"|6–0
|style="font-size:88%" rowspan=4|7–9 December 2018
|style="font-size:88%" rowspan=4|2018 Alans International
|style="text-align:left;font-size:88%;" rowspan=4|
 Vladikavkaz, Russia
|-
|Win
|23–3
|align=left| Zhargal Damdinov
|style="font-size:88%"|Fall
|-
|Win
|22–3
|align=left| Beka Bujiashvili
|style="font-size:88%"|TF 11–0
|-
|Win
|21–3
|align=left| Ramiz Gamzatov
|style="font-size:88%"|9–2
|-
! style=background:white colspan=7 | 
|-
|Win
|20–3
|align=left| Eduard Grigorev
|style="font-size:88%"|8–5
|style="font-size:88%" rowspan=4|15–19 November 2018
|style="font-size:88%" rowspan=4|2018 International Cup
|style="text-align:left;font-size:88%;" rowspan=4|
 Khasavyurt, Russia
|-
|Win
|19–3
|align=left| Aliakhab Badrudinov
|style="font-size:88%"|TF 13–2
|-
|Win
|18–3
|align=left| Amirkhan Guvazhokov
|style="font-size:88%"|Fall
|-
|Win
|17–3
|align=left| Ramazan Ferzaliev
|style="font-size:88%"|6–4
|-
! style=background:white colspan=7 |
|-
|Win
|16–3
|align=left| Christopher Potapov
|style="font-size:88%"|TF 10–0
|style="font-size:88%" rowspan=4|2–4 March 2018
|style="font-size:88%" rowspan=4|2018 Roman Dmitriev Memorial
|style="text-align:left;font-size:88%;" rowspan=4|
 Yakutsk, Russia
|-
|Win
|15–3
|align=left| Georgy Kichkin
|style="font-size:88%"|TF 10–0
|-
|Win
|14-3
|align=left| Alexander Neustroev
|style="font-size:88%"|TF 10–0
|-
|Win
|13–3
|align=left| Robert Manasyan
|style="font-size:88%"|TF 12–0
|-
! style=background:white colspan=7 | 
|-
|Win
|12–3
|align=left| Mukhambet Kuatbek
|style="font-size:88%"|8–4
|style="font-size:88%" rowspan=4|25–26 November 2017
|style="font-size:88%" rowspan=4|2017 Kunayev D.A.
|style="text-align:left;font-size:88%;" rowspan=4|
 Taraz, Kazakhstan
|-
|Win
|11–3
|align=left| Zhandos Karibai
|style="font-size:88%"|TF 10–0
|-
|Win
|10–3
|align=left| Arzyl Artysh-ool
|style="font-size:88%"|10–7
|-
|Win
|9–3
|align=left| Gabit Tolepbai
|style="font-size:88%"|TF 10–0
|-
! style=background:white colspan=7 | 
|-
|Loss
|8–3
|align=left| Zaur Uguev
|style="font-size:88%"|3–6
|style="font-size:88%" rowspan=4|12–13 October 2017
|style="font-size:88%" rowspan=4|2017 International Cup
|style="text-align:left;font-size:88%;" rowspan=4|
 Khasavyurt, Russia
|-
|Win
|8–2
|align=left| Gairbekov Djabrail
|style="font-size:88%"|TF 10–0
|-
|Win
|7–2
|align=left| Mukhammadkhon
|style="font-size:88%"|9–8
|-
|Win
|6–2
|align=left| Rassul Kaliyev
|style="font-size:88%"|TF 11–1
|-
! style=background:white colspan=7 |
|-
|Win
|5–2
|align=left| Roman Mikhailov
|style="font-size:88%"|TF 14–2
|style="font-size:88%" rowspan=5|4–5 March 2017
|style="font-size:88%" rowspan=5|2017 Roman Dmitriev Memorial
|style="text-align:left;font-size:88%;" rowspan=5|
 Yakutsk, Russia
|-
|Loss
|4–2
|align=left| Ruslan Zhendaev
|style="font-size:88%"|6–6
|-
|Win
|4–1
|align=left| Younes Aliakbari
|style="font-size:88%"|12–3
|-
|Win
|3–1
|align=left| Ali Sheriev
|style="font-size:88%"|10–4
|-
|Win
|2–1
|align=left| Revoly Samsonov
|style="font-size:88%"|Fall
|-
! style=background:white colspan=7 |
|-
|Loss
|1–1
|align=left| Zelimkhan Abakarov
|style="font-size:88%"|1–9
|style="font-size:88%" rowspan=2|27 January 2017
|style="font-size:88%" rowspan=2|Golden Grand Prix Ivan Yarygin 2017
|style="text-align:left;font-size:88%;" rowspan=2|
 Krasnoyarsk, Russia
|-
|Win
|1–0
|align=left| Yuki Takahashi
|style="font-size:88%"|8–2
|-

References

External links 
 

Living people
1998 births
Russian male sport wrestlers
European Wrestling Championships medalists
Sportspeople from Dagestan
World Wrestling Champions
European Wrestling Champions
21st-century Russian people